Aemilia fanum is a moth of the family Erebidae. It was described by Herbert Druce in 1900. It is found in Venezuela.

References

Phaegopterina
Moths described in 1900
Moths of South America